Kaw Fun Ying (born 10 December 1956) is a Malaysian sports shooter. He competed at the 1992 Summer Olympics and the 1996 Summer Olympics.

References

1956 births
Living people
Malaysian male sport shooters
Olympic shooters of Malaysia
Shooters at the 1992 Summer Olympics
Shooters at the 1996 Summer Olympics
Place of birth missing (living people)